The 1897 ICA Track Cycling World Championships were the World Championship for track cycling. They took place in Glasgow, United Kingdom from 30 July - 2 August 1897. Four events for men were contested, two for professionals and two for amateurs.

Medal summary

Medal table

References

Track cycling
UCI Track Cycling World Championships by year
International cycle races hosted by Scotland
International sports competitions in Glasgow
1897 in track cycling
1890s in Glasgow
July 1897 sports events
August 1897 sports events